Gelbard is a surname. Notable people with the surname include:

 José Ber Gelbard (1917–1977), Argentine activist
 Robert S. Gelbard (born 1944), American diplomat
 Rudolf Gelbard (1930–2018), Austrian campaigner and Holocaust survivor

See also
 Gelbart